John Greg Ganske (born March 31, 1949) is an American politician, plastic surgeon, and retired U.S. Army reserve lieutenant colonel from Iowa. He served as a Republican member of the United States House of Representatives from 1995 to 2003 and was the unsuccessful Republican nominee for U.S. Senator from Iowa in 2002.

Early life and education
Ganske was born in New Hampton, Iowa to parents Victor and Mary Jo Ganske.  He earned honors in wrestling in high school, and was an American Field Service exchange student to Costa Rica in 1966.

He graduated from the University of Iowa with a B.A.with honors in political science and general science in 1972. In 1976, Ganske graduated from the University of Iowa School of Medicine, and subsequently completed a general surgery residency in 1982 at the Oregon Health Sciences Center and a plastic and reconstructive surgery residency at Harvard in 1984, training under Nobel Laureate Dr. Joe Murray.

Career 
Ganske worked as a plastic surgeon in Des Moines until he challenged veteran Democratic Congressman Neal Smith in 1994. Ganske campaigned in a cream 1958 DeSoto (Smith having won his first congressional race in that year), playing songs from that era. Ganske was also helped by the 1990s round of redistricting. Smith had previously represented a district that was more or less coextensive with the Des Moines metropolitan area, but redistricting had pushed it into southwestern Iowa, an area Smith did not know and that did not know him. In one of the biggest upsets in recent congressional history, Ganske defeated Smith by six points, largely by running up large margins in southwestern Iowa.

Ganske was nearly defeated for reelection in 1996, but was reelected with little difficulty in 1998 and 2000. He was considered a relatively moderate Republican, which played well in a district dominated by traditionally-Democratic Des Moines.

After the 2000 round of redistricting, much of the 4th district was shifted into the 5th district, which created a district that covered all of western Iowa. However, Ganske's home city of Des Moines was drawn into the 3rd district, represented by Democrat Leonard Boswell. Rather than running for reelection, Ganske ran for the United States Senate against incumbent Democrat Tom Harkin. He easily won the Republican nomination, but lost to Harkin by 10 points. Following that election, he resumed his practice in Des Moines.

Personal life 
During medical school, Ganske met and married his wife, Corrine Mikkelson.

External links

 

1949 births
Living people
American plastic surgeons
University of Iowa alumni
Politicians from Des Moines, Iowa
Physicians from Iowa
Republican Party members of the United States House of Representatives from Iowa
People from New Hampton, Iowa
21st-century American politicians